Stefan Andersson (born 20 May 1969) is a Swedish Bandy player who currently plays for Sandvikens AIK as a midfielder. Stefan was brought up by IK Heros BK but left to play at a higher level. Andersson is playing in his twentieth season for Sandvikens AIK.

Andersson has played for the Swedish national bandy team during the 1993–94 season. Andersson was a member of the Sandvikens AIK squads that won the Swedish championship in the 1999–2000, 2001–02 and 2002–03 seasons as well as being a member of the Bandy World Cup winning squad in 2001–02 season.

References

External links 

1969 births
Living people
Swedish bandy players
Sandvikens AIK players